Krzewica  is a village in the administrative district of Gmina Ulhówek, within Tomaszów Lubelski County, Lublin Voivodeship, in eastern Poland, close to the border with Ukraine. The village is located in the historical region Galicia.

The village has an approximate population of 200.

References

Villages in Tomaszów Lubelski County